Brandin Echols (born October 16, 1997) is an American football cornerback for the New York Jets of the National Football League (NFL). He played college football at Northwest Mississippi Community College and Kentucky and was drafted by the Jets in the sixth round of the 2021 NFL Draft.

College career

Echols was ranked as a threestar recruit by 247Sports.com coming out of high school. He committed to Kentucky on September 23, 2018.

Professional career

Echols was drafted by the New York Jets with the 200th pick in the sixth round of the 2021 NFL Draft. On May 7, 2021, Echols officially signed with the Jets.

Echols was named a starting cornerback to begin his rookie season in 2021. He started the first nine games before suffering a thigh injury in Week 10. On November 16, 2021, he was placed on injured reserve. He was activated on December 11.

References

External links
Kentucky bio

Living people
Kentucky Wildcats football players
New York Jets players
People from Southaven, Mississippi
Players of American football from Mississippi
American football cornerbacks
1997 births